Coleman Peak is a peak rising to about  on the northeast slope of Mount Erebus, Ross Island,  east of the summit of Fang Ridge. It was named by the New Zealand Geographic Board (2000) after Father John Coleman, a New Zealand chaplain, who traveled to Antarctica many times with the U.S. Antarctic Program.

References 

Mountains of Ross Island